Mouvements unis de la Résistance ("Unified Resistance Movements") was a French Resistance organisation, resulting from the  consolidation of three major Resistance movements ("Combat", "Franc-Tireur" and "Libération-Sud") in January 1943 and also the merger of the military arms of these movements within the Armée secrète (Secret Army).  Its committee was headed by Jean Moulin.  These three then merged with five other major movements to form the Conseil National de la Résistance.

References 

French Resistance networks and movements